Robert Michael Archibald (29 March 1980 – 23 January 2020) was a Scottish professional basketball player. A  power forward / center from the University of Illinois, he was selected by the Memphis Grizzlies in the 2002 NBA draft with the third pick of the second round (32nd overall).

Career
Archibald graduated from Lafayette High School in 1998, along with MLB player Ryan Howard. Archibald's father Bobby was a player for Murray BC in Scotland and was capped several times for Scotland and Great Britain's national teams.

NBA
After drafting him in the second round, the Memphis Grizzlies signed Archibald to a 2-year contract. After one season with the team, in which he played only 12 games, Archibald was traded with Brevin Knight and Cezary Trybański to the Phoenix Suns in exchange for Bo Outlaw and Jake Tsakalidis.
On 26 December 2003 Archibald was traded again, this time to the Orlando Magic. A week later he was traded, for the third time that season, to the Toronto Raptors in exchange for Mengke Bateer and Remon van de Hare. He played 30 games with the Raptors.

Archibald's final NBA game was on April 9th, 2004 in a 66 - 74 loss to the Detroit Pistons where he recorded 4 rebounds but no points.

Archibald holds NBA career averages of 1.2 points and 1.6 rebounds per game. He is the only Scotsman to play in the NBA.

Europe
Archibald played four seasons in the Euroleague with Scavolini Pesaro, Joventut Badalona and two seasons with Unicaja Málaga. 
In July 2011 he signed a one-year contract with CAI Zaragoza.
Archibald retired after the 2012 Summer Olympics in which he represented Great Britain.

International
Archibald represented the Scottish national basketball team at junior level. He joined the Great Britain national team as it formed in 2007. He represented Great Britain 46 times including EuroBasket 2009, EuroBasket 2011, and at the 2012 Summer Olympics.

Death
Archibald died aged 39 in Barrington, Illinois.

Career statistics

NBA

Regular season

Source

|-
| align="left" | 
| align="left" | Memphis
| 12 || 0 || 6.0 || .300 || – || .389 || 1.4 || 0.3 || 0.0 || 0.3 || 1.6
|-
| align="left" | 
| align="left" | Phoenix
| 1  || 0 || 6.0 || .000 || – || .500 || 1.0 || 1.0 || 0.0 || 0.0 || 1.0
|-
| align="left" | 
| align="left" | Orlando
| 1 || 0 || 4.0 || .500 || – || .000 || 1.0 || 0.0 || 1.0 || 0.0 || 2.0
|-
| align="left" | 
| align="left" | Toronto
| 30  || 3 || 8.2 || .267 || – || .481 || 1.7 || 0.4 || 0.4 || 0.1 || 1.0
|-
| style="text-align:left;"| Career
| style="text-align:left;"|
| 44 || 3 || 7.5 || .283 || – || .429 || 1.6 || 0.4 || 0.3 || 0.1 || 1.2

References

External links
NBA Player Profile @ NBA.com
Euroleague.net Profile

ACB Profile 
Herald, Archibald on familiar territory for key game
Scotland on Sunday, Archibald seeks new heights

1980 births
2020 deaths
Baloncesto Málaga players
Basketball players at the 2012 Summer Olympics
BC Azovmash players
British expatriate basketball people in Canada
British expatriate basketball people in Italy
British expatriate basketball people in Ukraine
British expatriate basketball people in the United States
Centers (basketball)
Illinois Fighting Illini men's basketball players
Joventut Badalona players
Liga ACB players
Memphis Grizzlies draft picks
Memphis Grizzlies players
National Basketball Association players from Scotland
Olympic basketball players of Great Britain
Orlando Magic players
People educated at Queen Anne High School, Dunfermline
Phoenix Suns players
Power forwards (basketball)
Scottish expatriate sportspeople in Canada
Scottish expatriate sportspeople in Italy
Scottish expatriate sportspeople in Spain
Scottish expatriate sportspeople in Ukraine
Sportspeople from Paisley, Renfrewshire
Toronto Raptors players
Valencia Basket players
Victoria Libertas Pallacanestro players
Scottish expatriate sportspeople in the United States